The UCI Para-cycling Road World Championships are the world championships for road cycling where athletes with a physical disability compete, organized by the Union Cycliste Internationale (UCI).

The Championships were earlier administered by the International Paralympic Committee. The UCI and the IPC organized the 2006 IPC Cycling World Championships, combined track and road event.

The 1994, 1998, 2002 and 2007 IPC World Championships combined track and road events.

Championships

Events

C1-C5 : Time Trial and Road Race - Men and Women
B : Time Trial and Road Race - Men and Women
H1-H5 : Time Trial and Road Race - Men and Women

See also
UCI Road World Championships
UCI Para-cycling Track World Championships

References

External links
UCI Para-cycling Results

 
Para-cycling Road Cycling World Championships
Road bicycle races
Recurring sporting events established in 2009